The 1948 Greyhound Derby took place during June with the final being held on 26 June 1948 at White City Stadium. The winner, Priceless Border, received a first prize of £1,500.

Final result 
At White City (over 525 yards):

Distances 
2, 2, 2, neck, 1½ (lengths)
The distances between the greyhounds are in finishing order and shown in lengths. From 1927-1950 one length was equal to 0.06 of one second but race times are shown as 0.08 as per modern day calculations.

Review
Priceless Border was a short ante post favourite at odds of 5-1, the brindle dog had been unlucky during the 1947 English Greyhound Derby and had already won the Wood Lane Stakes at White City. In the heats he broke his own track record with a 28.64 win. Another favourite Local Interprize missed the break in his heat and failed to pick up the leader Mazurka in a slow time of 29.24, but still qualified. Other notable first round winners who dipped under the 29 second barrier were Cheerful Comedy 28.95 and Don Gipsey 28.98.

One of the semi-finals paired Priceless Border, owned by ten year old Desmond O'Kane, with Local Interprize and the former ran out a three length winner in 28.76. In the next semi-final, the Longcross Cup champion Sheevaun impressed with a time of 28.74 around the 525 yard circuit and the remaining semi-final was won by Doughery Lad in 29.23.

Priceless Border drew trap one in the final and he trapped in front when the race got underway, he always led to finish two lengths clear of the field in a fast time of 28.78, Local Interprize ran well to stay only two lengths adrift, also breaking 29 seconds.

See also
1948 UK & Ireland Greyhound Racing Year

References

English Greyhound Derby
Greyhound Derby
English Greyhound Derby
English Greyhound Derby